Southampton Meadows is a mobile home community and census-designated place in southeastern Southampton County, Virginia. The population as of the 2010 Census was 592.

References

Census-designated places in Southampton County, Virginia
Census-designated places in Virginia